This is a list of members of the Irish House of Commons between 1692 and 1693. There were 300 MPs at a time in this period.

References
 
 

692